National Watersports Centre may refer to either of these organisations:

 Holme Pierrepont National Watersports Centre, operated by Sport England near Nottingham in England
 National Centre Cumbrae, former watersports centre operated by Sportscotland on the Isle of Cumbrae